Climate change in New York City could affect buildings/structures, wetlands, water supply, health, and energy demand, due to the high population and extensive infrastructure in the region. A seaport like New York is especially at risk if the sea level rises, with many bridges and tunnels in the city. Major facilities for Aviation in the New York metropolitan area, and the New York Passenger Ship Terminal, are also located in areas vulnerable to flooding. Flooding would be expensive to reverse. Tide gauge records indicate a rise in sea level of about 50 cm (20 inches) since 1860.

Rising temperatures could bring a higher risk of heat related deaths from heat waves and increased concentrations of ground-level ozone (potentially causing asthma and other health concerns). The New York Times has identified climate change as a contributing factor in the city's increasing level of rat infestation, stating that "[m]ilder winters — the result of climate change — make it easier for rats to survive and reproduce".

In June 2019 NYC made a climate emergency declaration.

Mitigation 
The NYC Mayor's Office Climate Policy and Programs team, who also manages the OneNYC program, said in 2018 that it is pledging to reduce greenhouse gas emissions by 80% by the year 2050 and align with the 1.5 degree Celsius target put into place under the Paris Agreement. Inroads have already begun, as the city's emissions have decreased 15% since 2005.  The aim is to develop low-carbon transportation options and mandate retrofits to city buildings. In 2018 the team has sued five companies (BP, Chevron, ConocoPhillips, Exxon Mobil, and Royal Dutch Shell) for being responsible for climate change, and divesting the City's pension funds from fossil fuels, the first major US city to do so. Mayor Bill de Blasio stated in support of the decision, "As climate change continues to worsen, it's up to the fossil fuel companies whose greed put us in this position to shoulder the costs of making New York City safer and more resilient."  The OneNYC program as of 2018 made progress towards renewable energy reliance; for instance, solar installations have increased six-fold since 2014, $500 million was invested to improve building energy efficiency, and an additional $1 billion allocated to preserving NYC's drinking water.

Coastal Flooding 

Flooding was the second highest cause of weather related fatalities in the United States in 2018. The projected 11-21 inches of sea level rise in New York City by 2050 and 4.17–9 feet by 2100 will compound the impacts of coastal flooding. The damage caused by Hurricane Sandy in 2012 served as an impetus for policymakers and residents to more seriously consider coastal resiliency efforts. Since then, regulations have been strengthened to better protect the 400,000 New Yorkers in the one percent annual chance floodplain. Additionally, in May 2017, New York Governor Andrew Cuomo announced the construction of a 5.3 mile seawall along the Staten Island coastline capable of withstanding coastal flooding of 15.6 feet, two feet higher than that caused by Hurricane Sandy. When completed, the seawall will reduce damages by approximately $30 million.

Adaptation 
New York in 2009 launched a task force to advise on preparing city infrastructure for flooding, water shortages, and higher temperatures.  The New York City water supply system has been built to provide for its water needs. The NYC Mayor's Office Climate Policy and Programs team is investing $20 billion to adapt the city's neighborhoods to climate change threats like flooding, heat, and sea level rise.

The Lower Manhattan Coastal Resiliency initiative aims to address threats to the Financial District and surrounding neighborhoods.

In 2019, the city allocated $615 million for a 5.1 mile East Shore Seawall, a combined seawall and walkway on Staten Island, officially called the Staten Island Multi-Use Elevated Promenade.

Influences on New York City climate change 
The Emergency Planning and Community Right-to-Know Act of 1986 is intended to protect citizens against industrial toxic pollution.  This information is available in order to keep track of increasing toxin releases and identify high toxic-releasing companies. Once these records are publicly released, individuals have the freedom to respond to that information however they please. If a shareholder of a specific facility is discouraged by the facility's amount of toxin releases, that person may choose to remove themselves as a shareholder. This is why is it important to minimize underreporting or overreporting of toxic emissions. Although this information is available to the public, New York seems to continue to struggle with keeping carbon emissions low. According to the NYC Mayor's Office of Sustainability, New York City generates 14 million tons of waste and recyclables annually at a cost of $300 million for residential waste alone.

Scorecard has documented that the risk of cancer from New York County hazardous air pollutants in each category was almost always the same for each side of the spectrum (kids below poverty and kids above poverty, for example). The information also shows that the lower-income and minority groups emit a greater percentage of toxins and pollutants than others. Toxic disposal and storage facilities (TDSF) are built in low-income areas with lower-valued homes because those residing there are less likely to have the purchasing and political power to fight against it, unlike those living in high-income communities. This means that they will not have the means to make a change against this, so TSDF's are often built in low-income communities with lower-valued houses. Even so, the 2010 New York State Hazardous Waste Facility Siting Plan states that the number of commercial TSD facilities in New York have declined over time with 30 commercial TSD facilities in 1988 and 13 commercial TSD facilities in 2008. This is a positive and negative accomplishment, because there are fewer TSDF's in general, but there are increased usage and pollution emission levels at the few TSDF's that are available.

The 2010 New York State Hazardous Waste Facility Siting Plan also presents important information when evaluating the TSDF's in each county. Chapter 1 of the siting plan states that ten-day transfer stations, generators that store for less than 90 days, facilities or locations for collecting household hazardous wastes, facilities for collecting non-manifested waste such as universal waste, sanitary landfills, and trucks are not included as TSD facilities in the detailed analyses included in the plan. This shows that not all hazardous waste facilities are taken into consideration when examining the eligibility of a county for building more facilities. Omitting such facilities from the analyses presents inaccurate calculations and assumptions. Those facilities still emit pollution and wastes, regardless of the size of facility or time-length of the waste transfer. 
 
Someone who lives in a single-family houses emits more toxic chemicals into the environment than someone who lives in multifamily buildings, since detached houses use more energy.  Many people rely on public transit in New York City because it is cheaper and easier than using a car.  This intense use of the public transit system decreases those people's carbon emissions. The Scorecard analysis states that New York experiences only 45% of days with good air quality in a year and 1% of days with unhealthful air quality. Because of this, New York ranked among the 10% dirtiest/worst of all counties in the United States in 2003. In regards to air quality management, the Mayor's Office of Sustainability states that “the City has implemented a policy to reduce, replace, retrofit and refuel City vehicles. In 2014, the City reduced its fleet by at least 5 percent and expanded the use of biodiesel. Additionally, 400 vehicles were upgraded through the Congestion Mitigation and Air Quality (CMAQ) and other funding sources, and Diesel Particulate Filters (DPFs) were installed on 685 buses in 2014”.

In literature 
New York 2140 is a 2017 climate fiction novel set in New York City by American science fiction author Kim Stanley Robinson.

See also 
New York Harbor Storm-Surge Barrier
Climate change in the United States
Climate change in New York (state)
Climate change and cities

References

External links
Archive-It: New York Climate Change Science Web Archive

New York City
Environmental issues in New York City
Air pollution in New York City